Nicolai von Dellingshausen (born 22 January 1993) is a German professional golfer who currently plays on the Challenge Tour.

Von Dellingshausen turned professional in late 2016 and played on the 2017 Pro Golf Tour. In February he lost in a four-way playoff in the Tony Jacklin Open, before winning the Tazegzout Open in March. He had further wins in the Adamstal Open and the Sierra Polish Open, as well as two more runner-up finishes. His third win earned him immediate promotion to the Challenge Tour. In his third Challenge Tour event, he was runner-up in the 2017 Bridgestone Challenge, where Oscar Lengdén took victory with a birdie-birdie-eagle finish. He won the 2017 Pro Golf Tour Order of Merit.

Amateur wins
2011 Belgian International Youths
2013 German Match Play
2016 German Match Play, European Men's Club Trophy

Source:

Professional wins (3)

Pro Golf Tour wins (3)

Team appearances
Amateur
European Amateur Team Championship (representing Germany): 2015

References

External links

German male golfers
1993 births
Living people